Capps Creek may refer to:

Capps Creek (Current River), a stream in Missouri
Capps Creek (Shoal Creek), a stream in Newton County, Missouri